Tebucky Shermain Jones (born October 6, 1974) is a former American football safety in the National Football League (NFL). His professional career began when he was drafted out of Syracuse University in the first round of the 1998 NFL Draft by the New England Patriots. He also played for the Miami Dolphins and the New Orleans Saints.

Professional career

Jones is best known for his role on the 2001 Patriots team that won Super Bowl XXXVI. In the Super Bowl, in the fourth quarter with the St. Louis Rams in a do-or-die situation down 3-17 against the Patriots, Rams quarterback Kurt Warner fumbled on 4th-and-3 next to the goal line, and Tebucky Jones picked up the fumble and raced down the length of the field for what would have been a 97-yard touchdown, but the return was negated by a holding penalty on Patriots linebacker Willie McGinest.

Personal life
Jones resides in Farmington, Connecticut, where he is the head coach for the New Britain Golden Hurricanes, his former high school team.

On August 1, 2008, Jones was arrested at the Mohegan Sun casino in Uncasville, Connecticut after he was accused of allegedly making “inappropriate contact” with a woman in the lobby, and then punched her boyfriend in the face when he got involved.

His brother, James Jones, who also graduated from New Britain High School, currently works as a dean of students at Slade Middle School in New Britain.

His son, Tebucky Jones Jr., played college football at the University of Connecticut and Fordham University and was briefly a member the Tennessee Titans before being cut during the preseason.

References

External links
 
 buck34.com -- Official Website

1974 births
Syracuse Orange football players
Miami Dolphins players
New England Patriots players
New Orleans Saints players
American football safeties
African-American players of American football
Living people
Players of American football from Connecticut
Sportspeople from New Britain, Connecticut
21st-century African-American sportspeople
20th-century African-American sportspeople